The 2014 Clipsal 500 Adelaide was a motor race for V8 Supercars held on 1 and 2 March 2014. It was the first round of the 2014 International V8 Supercars Championship, and marked the racing debut of the Volvo S60 in the series.

Triple Eight Race Engineering won both of the shorter races; Jamie Whincup led home Craig Lowndes for a 1–2 in the opening race, while Lowndes took the second race victory. The weekend's longer race was taken by James Courtney of the Holden Racing Team, holding off Lowndes by 0.7 seconds. Lowndes left Adelaide with a 52-point championship lead over Brad Jones Racing's Fabian Coulthard, who took three top five placings over the weekend. Shane van Gisbergen took third for the round, taking third-place finishes in the opening and closing races.

Report

Race 1

Qualifying

Race

Race 2

Qualifying

Race

Race 3

Qualifying

Notes:
 — Robert Dahlgren experienced a drop in oil pressure, forcing him to stop the car. The car was unable to be repaired before the end of the qualifying session.

Top 10 Shootout

Notes:
 — Scott McLaughlin's time was deleted after he triggered the kerb sensor at turn 2.

Race

Championship standings after the race

Drivers' Championship standings

Teams' Championship standings

 Note: Only the top five positions are included for both sets of standings.

References

Adelaide 500
Clipsal 500